The third season of Golden Kamuy is a 2020 Japanese anime series, based on the manga series of the same title, written and illustrated by Satoru Noda. On July 7, 2019, it was announced that the series would receive a third season. The staff and cast returned to reprise their roles. On March 13, 2020, it was announced that the third season would premiere in October 2020. The series premiered on October 5, 2020 and ran for 12 episodes. The opening theme is "Grey" by Fomare while the ending theme is "Yūsetsu" by The Sixth Lie.

Crunchyroll streamed the third season in North America, Central America, South America, Europe, Africa, Oceania, the Middle East, and the Commonwealth of Independent States. Funimation streamed the third season with an English dub at a later date.


Episode list

Notes

References

2020 Japanese television seasons
Golden Kamuy episode lists